The National Prize for Sciences was an award that was part of the National Prize of Chile until 1992. It was created by law 16746, promulgated on 24 January 1968, and published in the Official Journal on 14 February of the same year. This made the National Commission for Scientific and Technological Research (CONICYT) an autonomous body with legal personhood.

This prize was granted to the Chilean scientist or team of scientists whose work in the field of pure or applied sciences was entitled to such distinction (per Article 2 of Law 16746). Initially it was granted annually, being modified by Law 17595 of 1972, which ordered that it would be given every two years.

In 1992, through Law 19169, it was replaced by the National Prizes for Exact Sciences, Natural Sciences, and Applied Sciences and Technologies.

Winners
1969,  (biology)
1970, Herbert Appel (chemistry)
1971, Ricardo Donoso Novoa (history)
1973,  (medicine)
1975,  (biology)
1977, Jorge Mardones Restart (pharmacology)
1979, Héctor Croxatto (biology)
1981,  (physics)
1983, Hermann Niemeyer (biochemistry)
1985, Luis Vargas Fernández (physiology)
1987,  (genetics)
1989, Gustavo Höeker Salas (immunology)
1991, Enrique Tirapegui Zurbano (physics)

See also
 CONICYT

References

1969 establishments in Chile
1992 disestablishments in South America
Chilean science and technology awards
Awards disestablished in 1992